Münchhausen is the surname associated with a German noble family of 

The surname may refer to:

Hieronymus Karl Friedrich, Freiherr von Münchhausen, German nobleman and storyteller
Baron Munchausen,  fictional character inspired by Hieronymus Karl Friedrich, Freiherr von Münchhausen
Börries von Münchhausen, German poet
Otto von Münchhausen, German botanist
Johannes V von Münchhausen (1542–1560),  Prince-Bishop of Ösel–Wiek
Philipp Adolph von Münchhausen,  Head of the German Chancery in London

See also
Münchhausen (disambiguation), for other uses
Freiherr von Münchhausen (disambiguation)

German-language surnames